Kanonicza Street (Polish: Ulica Kanonicza, lit. Canon Street) - a historic street in Kraków, Poland. The street was once part of the hamlet of Okół, connected with Kraków in 1401. Formerly, the buildings along the street housed cathedral canons, and to this day many of their Baroque and Renaissance have remained present.

The southern end of the street was closed off with the Poboczna Gate, demolished during the urban modernisation of Kraków.

Features

References

Streets in Kraków